The NRL Touch Premiership is the premier national domestic touch football competition in Australia. It was formed in 2018, through a partnership between its governing body, Touch Football Australia (TFA), and the National Rugby League (NRL). The premiership includes a separate men's and women's competition, and features elite touch football players from around Australia, many of which are current Australian representatives.

History 
Through the NRL Touch Football partnership between TFA and the NRL, a national elite touch football competition was proposed to commence in 2018. It was agreed to replace the existing Elite 8 division from the National Touch League, with an initial six teams being chosen to enter the new competition.

The first season of the NRL Touch Premiership commenced with games in the first round played on May 18, 2018, at Sydney's Stadium Australia, and May 19, 2018, at Townsville's Willows Sports Complex, prior to the scheduled Round 11 games of the 2018 NRL season.

Teams 
The inaugural teams aligned to existing NRL clubs consisted of three from Queensland (Broncos, Cowboys, and Titans) and three from New South Wales (Eels, Knights, and Tigers). An expansion of the premiership was announced on October 5, 2018 to include the New Zealand Warriors, and followed on November 2, 2018 by an announcement that the Sydney Roosters would also field teams, bringing the total clubs to eight for the 2019 season.

Rules 
The NRL Touch Premiership is played under the standard touch football playing rules, as set by Touch Football Australia, with minor variations to accommodate venue and broadcast partnerships.

Variations

Field of Play 
The field size is slightly reduced to be 60 meters long by 48 meters wide. A standard-sized touch football field is 70 meters long by 50 meters wide.

Corner posts are located at the intersection of the scoreline and sideline, and a small rectangular marker is located on the sideline, five meters in-field from the scoreline, to indicate the 5 metre line.

Match Length 
Each match will be played in two halves of fifteen minutes duration, with a two-minute half-time break.

Drawn Matches 
Should scores be level at the conclusion of normal time, the match will proceed into an extra time period of three minutes. Both teams will immediately have their on-field playing strength reduced to three players and the team that won the toss prior to the commencement of the match will receive possession of the ball and commence play with a tap on the centre of the half-way line.

If the team receiving first possession scores a touchdown within their first set, the touchdown is awarded and the opposing team receives possession and re-commences play with a tap at the centre of halfway.

If the opposing team fails to score within their replying set, the first team to score will be declared the winner.

However, if the opposing team does score, the touchdown is awarded and play is recommenced by the initial team to score. The next team to score after this point will be declared the winner.

If the score remains level after three minutes of extra time, the match will be declared a draw.

Match Officials 

Match officials are appointed by Touch Football Australia, under the guidance of National High-Performance Referees Coach, Ian Matthew.

In 2019, with the addition of the New Zealand Warriors, all games in New Zealand will have their match officials appointed by Touch New Zealand, under the guidance of Stu McDonald.

2018 Referee Squad 

David Baggio
Roberto Bowen
Tony Kebabria
Brett Freshwater
Luke Heckendorf
Luke McKenzie
Luke Saldern

Christopher Schwerdt
Amanda Sheeky
Kim Skelly
Anthony Smith
Brad Smith
Denise Weier
Michael Littlefield

2019 NZ Referee Squad 
Note that these referees will only officiate Warriors home games.

Tony Arnel
Ray Cairns
Isaac Cosson
Caleb Downes
John Dustow
Logan Forrester
Taneshia Gill
Kurt Harrison
Richie Heap

Caitlin Kimpton
Ben Matthews
Cameron McDonald-Pietersen
Alisha Ruaiti
Dali Tui-Taylor
Harley Wall
Thomas Webster
Miah Williams
John Wright

Broadcast 
Within Australia, all matches are broadcast on Fox Sports Australia's Fox League channel, Kayo Sports Streaming Service and Sky Sports NZ through a mix of live and delayed telecasts.

See also

 Touch Football Australia
 National Touch League
 National Rugby League

References

External links
 

National Rugby League
2018 establishments in Australia
Sports leagues established in 2018
Sports leagues in Australia
Touch competitions
Fox Sports (Australian TV network)